Acrolepia peyerhimoffella is a moth of the family Acrolepiidae. It was described by Sand in 1879.

References

Moths described in 1879
Acrolepiidae